Esperstedt is a village and a former municipality in the Saalekreis district, Saxony-Anhalt, Germany. Since 1 January 2010, it is part of the municipality Obhausen.

Geography
Esperstedt is situated on the river Weida and is located between Halle (Saale) and Querfurt.

History
The earliest known documented mention of the village is listed in Hersfeld Abbey's tithing rolls from between 881 and 899 as the tithable place Osperstadt in Friesenfeld. Around 900 the village belonged to the Castellan Schraplau in Hassegau. In 1200 it belonged to the Archbishopric of Magdeburg. The name is derived from the word Espen meaning aspen or poplar tree.

Transport 
Exit 20 of the Bundesautobahn 38 Göttingen–Leipzig is located at the edge of town.

Sights 
 Church in the lower village
 Gravestone in the Ortsfriedhof cemetery for the communist miner Max König, who died in 1937 in Lichtenburg concentration camp on account of ill-treatment.

References

Former municipalities in Saxony-Anhalt
Saalekreis